Ficus aspera, the mosaic fig, a plant native to Vanuatu in the south Pacific region. The plant first appeared in scientific literature in 1786, published by the German botanist Georg Forster, from a specimen collected from Tanna Island. The mosaic fig is used as an ornamental plant. The fruit are cauliflorous (fruit forming from their main stems or woody trunks rather than from new growth and shoots).

References 

aspera
Flora of Vanuatu
Plants described in 1786
Ornamental trees